Udma or UDMA may refer to:

 Udma, a town in the Indian state of Kerala.
 Ultra Direct Memory Access (UDMA), a set of standards for Direct Memory Access (DMA) data transfer